The Solid Waste and Public Cleansing Management Act 2007, is a Malaysian laws which enacted to provide for and regulate the management of controlled solid waste and public cleansing for the purpose of maintaining proper sanitation and for matters incidental thereto.

Preamble
WHEREAS sanitation is a matter within the Concurrent List in the Ninth Schedule to the Federal Constitution:
AND WHEREAS matters relating to the management of controlled solid waste and public cleansing are now administered by the various local authorities:
AND WHEREAS it is expedient for the purpose of ensuring uniformity of law and policy to make a law for the proper control and regulation of matters relating to the management of controlled solid waste and public cleansing throughout Peninsular Malaysia and the Federal Territories of Putrajaya and Labuan:
AND WHEREAS it is also expedient that provisions be made to confer executive authority on the Federation for matters relating to the management of controlled solid waste and public cleansing throughout Peninsular Malaysia and the Federal Territories of Putrajaya and Labuan:

Structure
The Solid Waste and Public Cleansing Management Act 2007, in its current form (30 January 2007), consists of 12 Parts containing 112 sections and no schedule (including no amendment).
 Part I: Preliminary
 Part II: Administration
 Part III: Approval for the Construction, Alteration or Closure of Prescribed Solid Waste Management Facilities
 Part IV: Licensing Provisions
 Part V: Charges
 Part VI: Tribunal for Solid Waste Management Services
 Part VII: Assumption of Control
 Part VIII: Control of Solid Waste Generators and Persons in Possession of Controlled Solid Waste
 Part IX: Enforcement Provisions
 Part X: Reduction and Recovery of Controlled Solid Waste
 Part XI: General
 Part XII: Savings and Transitional

References

External links
 Solid Waste and Public Cleansing Management Act 2007 

2007 in Malaysian law
Malaysian federal legislation